Matman District or Metman District is a district of Shan State, Burma. It is part of the Wa Self-Administered Division. It was formerly part of Hopang District. Matman District consists of three townships: Matman, Namphan and Pangsang.

References

2011 establishments in Myanmar
Districts of Myanmar
Geography of Shan State